Wakana Koga (born 28 June 2001) is a Japanese judoka. She won the silver medal in the women's 48 kg event at the 2021 World Judo Championships held in Budapest, Hungary. In the final, she lost against Natsumi Tsunoda.

She won one of the bronze medals in her event at the 2022 Judo Grand Slam Paris held in Paris, France.

References

External links
 

Living people
2001 births
Place of birth missing (living people)
Japanese female judoka
21st-century Japanese women